Gagauz people are one of the largest ethnic minorities in Moldova. During the Russian colonization of southern Bessarabia (Budjak), in the early 19th century, the Gagauz people moved from the eastern Balkans, beginning to stabilize their presence on the future territory of the Republic of Moldova. The Gagauz are not equally distributed on the territory of Moldova, living primarily in the southern part of the country, particularly in the Autonomous Territorial Unit of Gagauzia. They follow a primarily rural lifestyle.

Population

The Gagauz are the third minority ethnic group in the Republic of Moldova, counting 126,010 people according to the 2014 census, i.e. 4.57% of the total population (without Transnistria). Their share in the ethnic composition of the country is gradually increasing. They are the majority of Gagauzia's population (83.8%), while in Taraclia District, which is inhabited primarily by Bulgarians, they comprise 9.0% of the total population. In Bessarabsky District they are 7.4% of the district's population, but gradually declining. In Cahul district, they have a small presence (2.7% of the district's population). In the rest of Moldova their share is lower than 1%. The internal migration of Gagauz in Moldova is low. Most Gagauz who leave Gagauzia migrate to Russia.

History

Ethnolinguistic features
Due to their concentration in the areas around the border between Moldova and Ukraine, modern Gagauz people marry primarily with other Gagauz; thus keeping a high degree of ethnic stability. However, in the recent past, the situation was somewhat different. In the early 20th century, the ratio of Gagauz and Bulgarians in the population of Comrat was approximately 2:1. In the late 20th century, due to assimilation and higher fertility rates within the Gagauz, the ratio was 1:14. Nowadays, similar ratios between Gagauz and Bulgarians are preserved in some villages. For practical reasons, a contemporary Gagauz usually speaks at least two languages. In their daily life they use Gagauz and Russian, but many can speak Romanian as well.

See also
 Bessarabian Bulgarians

References

Ethnic groups in Moldova
Gagauz people